Choi Hyo-jung (born on July 28, 1994), better known mononymously as Hyojung is a South Korean singer. She is the leader of the South Korean girl group Oh My Girl.

Early life
Hyojung was born on July 28, 1994, in Anyang, Gyeonggi-do, South Korea.

Career

2015–2018: Debut with Oh My Girl & other activities

On April 20, 2015, Hyojung made her debut as a member of Oh My Girl with their first extended play, Oh My Girl.

In February 2017, she competed on King of Mask Singer under the name "Moon," appearing in episode 98.

In April 2018, alongside Arin and Binnie, she debuted in Oh My Girl's first sub-unit, Oh My Girl Banhana.

2019–present: Solo activities
In August 2019, it was confirmed that Hyojung would be taking part in Queendom.

In January 2020, she became a DJ for Naver Now's "Avenger Girls".

In September 2020, she was announced to be a host for OnStyle's Get It Beauty.

Hyojung participated in the OST for SBS' Hyena with "Today, Just Like Yesterday (오늘도 어제처럼)", released on March 21, 2020.

On February 22, 2021, Hyojung was chosen by Walt Disney Company Korea to sing the Korean version of "Lead The Way" for Disney's animated film, Raya and the Last Dragon.

Discography

Singles

Composition credits
All song credits are adapted from the Korea Music Copyright Association's database, unless otherwise noted.

Filmography

Television shows

Web shows

Radio Shows

References

1994 births
Living people
21st-century South Korean women singers
South Korean women pop singers
South Korean female idols
Oh My Girl members
People from Anyang, Gyeonggi
WM Entertainment artists
K-pop singers